The following is a list of pipeline accidents in the United States in 1988. It is one of several lists of U.S. pipeline accidents. See also: list of natural gas and oil production accidents in the United States.

Incidents 
This is not a complete list of all pipeline accidents. For natural gas alone, the Pipeline and Hazardous Materials Safety Administration (PHMSA), a United States Department of Transportation agency, has collected data on more than 3,200 accidents deemed serious or significant since 1987.

A "significant incident" results in any of the following consequences:
 Fatality or injury requiring in-patient hospitalization.
 $50,000 or more in total costs, measured in 1984 dollars.
 Liquid releases of five or more barrels (42 US gal/barrel).
 Releases resulting in an unintentional fire or explosion.

PHMSA and the National Transportation Safety Board (NTSB) post-incident data and results of investigations into accidents involving pipelines that carry a variety of products, including natural gas, oil, diesel fuel, gasoline, kerosene, jet fuel, carbon dioxide, and other substances. Occasionally pipelines are re-purposed to carry different products.

The following incidents occurred during 1988:
 January 5; a Colonial Pipeline mainline ruptured, spilling about 100,000 gallons of home heating oil in Deptford Township, New Jersey. The cause of the pipeline failure was corrosion.
 January 18; a natural gas explosion destroyed the building housing the K&W Cafeteria and the lobby of the Sheraton Motor Inn at Winston-Salem, North Carolina. Two adjoining motel wings suffered structural damage. Of the four persons in the lobby/cafeteria building at the time of the explosion, three sustained minor injuries. The fourth person sustained a fractured ankle. One motel guest also sustained minor cuts.
One hundred thirty people were evacuated. No one was injured.
 February 17; a Sunoco pipeline near Pleasant Township, Seneca County, Ohio ruptured, spilling over 200,000 gallons of toluene, with about 173,000 gallons of it being lost. 4,200 people had to evacuate their homes for a time.  The cause was previous third party damage.
 March 19, 130 people were evacuated from their homes, after a vehicle hit a valve on a Columbia Gas Transmission pipeline in Hempfield, Pennsylvania. There was no gas ignition.
 April 9, a 20-inch crude oil pipeline failed in a Peoria County, Illinois subdivision. About  of crude were spilled, contaminating 2 private lakes.
 On April 15, at a Sunoco tank farm, in Crittenden County, Arkansas, a spill resulted in the loss of about 29,000 gallons of petroleum products.
 April 18; a backhoe hit a 10-inch gas pipeline in Springfield, Massachusetts. Two Interstate freeways were shut down, and, 125 to 150 people were evacuated for a time from nearby businesses. 
 April 26; A Kaneb Pipeline Terminal had a spill of 20,000 gallons of gasoline, in Milford, Iowa. Operator error was given as the cause of the spill.
 June 16; an Enbridge crude oil pipeline failed near Romeo, Michigan, spilling about 370,000 gallons of crude oil. Attempt to burn the crude oil led to vegetation fires in the area.
 July 22; a pair of MAPCO LPG/NGL pipelines failed in an explosion south of Topeka, Kansas. 200 nearby residents had to be evacuated, and there was serious damage to US Route 75 nearby from the explosion & following fire. An ERW seam selective corrosion failure in one of the pipelines caused the failure.
 August 31; a gas company crew struck and ruptured a fitting on a 4-inch plastic gas main in Green Oaks, Illinois. While the crew was attempting to excavate a nearby valve to shut off the flow of gas, the backhoe struck an unmarked power cable. The gas ignited and four gas company employees were injured.
 September 1; a crude oil pipeline ruptured, spilling about 132,000 gallons of crude oil in Encino, California. The crude flowed into storm drains, and then into the Los Angeles River. Electrical interference to Cathodic protection from other pipelines was suspected to have cause the corrosion that caused the failure. The crude oil pipeline was on top of a steel water pipeline, which would directly interfere with Cathodic protection efforts.
 September 16; a natural gas explosion in Overland Park, Kansas, involved gas leaking from corrosion holes in the customer-owned line. Gas migrated underground to the house and was ignited. The house was destroyed and the four residents were injured.
 October 9; third party damage to a Yellowstone Pipeline Company line caused the line to fail, near Garrison, Montana. About 260,000 gallons of petroleum products were lost.
 October 11; corrosion caused a Chevron LPG pipeline to fail, in Martin County, Texas. One person was killed.
 November 8; corrosion of a 14-inch underground pipeline owned and operated by the Shell Oil Company, a predecessor of Shell Pipeline Corporation (Shell), resulted in the release of an estimated  of gasoline. Approximately 2,100 people live within a  radius of the November 1988 release point.
 November 18; thousands of air travelers were temporarily stranded after a construction crew at San Francisco International Airport accidentally ruptured an underground jet fuel pipeline. The break, which spilled 50,000 gallons before the pipeline was shut down, cut off fuel supplies to all three of the airport's airline terminals. More than 200 flights were disrupted, officials said.
 November 25; a natural gas explosion and fire in Kansas City, Missouri, involved a break in a customer owned service line, at a threaded joint that was affected by corrosion. One person was killed and five persons injured in the explosion that severely damaged the residence.
 November 28; a mower hit a propane pipeline & ruptured it in Friendswood, Texas. About 4,836 barrels of propane were lost. 2 people were injured.
Snow complicated the cleanup. The leak occurred late December 1, but was not discovered until early December 2. An ERW seam fatigue crack caused the failure.
 December 11; a natural gas pipeline outside Carthage, Texas, exploded and burned, forcing residents of two nearby subdivisions to evacuate. No injuries were reported.
A pipeline worker in Oklahoma failed to notice the pipeline's plummeting pressure gauges for at least two hours. 1,000 workers at a brewery were idled for 3 days, due to the pollution of the breweries' water source. An ERW seam defect in the pipe was determined to be the cause of the failure.

References

Lists of pipeline accidents in the United States